Buildings around the world listed by usable space (volume), footprint (area), and floor space (area) comprise single structures that are suitable for continuous human occupancy. There are, however, some exceptions, including factories and warehouses.

The Aerium near Berlin, Germany is the largest uninterrupted volume in the world, while Boeing's factory in Everett, Washington, United States is the world's largest building by volume. The AvtoVAZ main assembly building in Tolyatti, Russia is the largest building in area footprint. The Yiwu International Trade City in Yiwu, China is the largest building in terms of total floor area. Due to the incomplete nature of this list, buildings are not ranked.

Largest usable volume

Buildings around the world with the largest usable space, sorted by volume, having a volume of at least :

Largest floor area

Buildings with the largest usable floor area including multiple stories of at least :

Special categories

Other buildings which are the largest of their type:

See also
 List of largest office buildings
 List of largest shopping malls
 List of tallest buildings
 List of largest mosques

References